Samir Frangieh (4 December 1945 – 11 April 2017) was a Lebanese politician and a leftist intellectual. He was a member of the Lebanese Parliament. He was from the Frangieh family, one of the well-known political families of Lebanon.

Early life
Frangieh was born in Zgharta on 4 December 1945. He hailed from an old political family, Frangieh family. He is the son of Hamid Kabalan Frangieh and Lamia Michel (née Raffoul). Hamid Frangieh was the elder brother of Suleiman Frangieh who was the President of Lebanon in the period 1970-1976. Therefore, Suleiman Frangieh Jr. and Samir Frangieh were cousins.

Career
Frangieh was a leading journalist. He contributed to many leading publications, including L'Orient (1970), L'Orient-Le Jour (1971–1975), Le Monde diplomatique, Libération, An Nahar, As Safir and Financial Times.

He joined the Lebanese Communist Party and left it in 1967. He was the founder of the Lebanese Communist Union which was disestablished in 1970. He was also a member of the National Movement Center. During the term of President Émile Lahoud, Frangieh was one of the opposition leaders, who tried to challenge close allies of the president. The opposition group was also led by Rafik Hariri and Walid Jumblatt. Frangieh was a political ally of Jumblatt.

Frangieh was also one of the founders of the Qornet Shehwan Gathering. In addition, he was part of the 14 March Alliance and a member of its general secretariat. He was the author of "Beirut manifesto" that was published in Le Monde on 22 June 2004. The manifesto, which was signed by Lebanese intellectuals and eminent public figures, challenged the dominance of Syria in Lebanon.

In the 2005 general elections, he became a member of the Lebanese Parliament, representing Zgharta. However, in the general elections of 2009, Frangieh was not included in the election list of the March 14 alliance.

Personal life and death
Frangieh was married to Anne Mourani with whom he had two children. He was the author of The Journey to the Extreme of Violence that was published in 2011. He died on 11 April 2017 in Beirut's Hotel Dieu Hospital.

References

External links
Samir Frangieh on Ehden Family Tree

20th-century journalists
20th-century Lebanese writers
21st-century journalists
21st-century Lebanese writers
1945 births
2017 deaths
Commandeurs of the Légion d'honneur
Deaths from cancer in Lebanon
Samir
Lebanese journalists
Lebanese Maronites
March 14 Alliance
Members of the Parliament of Lebanon
People from Zgharta
Lebanese Communist Party politicians